Keith Henderson (born August 4, 1966) is a former American football running back who played for the San Francisco 49ers and Minnesota Vikings of the National Football League.

Henderson attended the University of Georgia.  He was selected in the third round (84th overall) of the 1989 NFL Draft by the 49ers.  He was acquired by the Vikings in September 1992.

Statistics

References

1966 births
Living people
People from Cartersville, Georgia
Sportspeople from the Atlanta metropolitan area
Players of American football from Georgia (U.S. state)
American football running backs
Georgia Bulldogs football players
San Francisco 49ers players
Minnesota Vikings players